Hyposmocoma nebulifera is a species of moth of the family Cosmopterigidae. It was first described by Lord Walsingham in 1907. It is endemic to the Hawaiian island of Oahu.

The length of the forewings is 5.8–6 mm for males and 6.5–7.2 mm for females.

The larval case is dark brown, smooth, 8.1 mm in length and 2.5 mm wide.

References

External links

nebulifera
Endemic moths of Hawaii
Moths described in 1907
Taxa named by Thomas de Grey, 6th Baron Walsingham